The Distributed Array Processor (DAP) produced by
International Computers Limited (ICL) was the world's first commercial
massively parallel computer. The original paper study was
complete in 1972 and building of the prototype began in 1974.
The first machine was delivered to
Queen Mary College in 1979.

Development
The initial 'Pilot DAP' was designed and implemented by Dr Stewart
F Reddaway with the aid of David J Hunt and Peter M Flanders at the
ICL Stevenage Labs. Their manager and a major contributor was John K Iliffe who had designed the Basic Language Machine—he is well known nowadays for Iliffe vectors.

The ICL DAP had 64×64 single bit processing elements (PEs) with 4096 bits of storage per PE. It was attached to an ICL mainframe and its memory was mapped into the mainframe's memory. Programs for the DAP were written in DAP FORTRAN which was FORTRAN extended with 64×64 matrix and 64 element vector primitives. DAP Fortran compiled to an assembly language called APAL (Array Processor Assembly Language). The DAP had a Single Instruction Multiple Data (SIMD) architecture. Each operation could be performed under the control of a mask which controlled which elements were affected. Array programs were executed as subroutines of normal mainframe FORTRAN programs and IO was handled by the mainframe.

Operationally, there was an overhead to transfer computational data into and out of the array, and problems which did not fit the 64×64 matrix imposed additional complexity to handle the boundaries (65×65 was perhaps the worst case!)—but for problems which suited the architecture, it could outperform the current Cray pipeline architectures by two orders of magnitude.  The ICL 2980 was not a popular machine and this held back the use of the DAP as an attached processor was restricted initially to this one range.

The design as described in Reddaway's 1973 paper is pretty much that which was implemented in the first commercial version except the facility to supply address bits from the processing elements was removed. This change greatly simplified hardware error detection. A notable extra facility was carry propagation to simplify vector mode addition.

After ICL
The DAP [IP] was sold off to a venture capital-funded start-up company Active Memory Technology
(AMT) which was then taken over by Cambridge Parallel Processors (CPP).
It was enhanced and made smaller and faster as the Gamma series.
An 8-bit processor with some local 8-bit wide memory was added to the
processor and fast IO capabilities were implemented. It could be programmed in either C++ or Fortran-Plus. These were more flexible than DAP FORTRAN, in particular they automatically took care of choosing a mapping from user specified matrix and vector bounds to the underlying hardware.

Sample DAPs are in storage at the Computer History Museum.

CPP ceased trading in 2004.

Mini-DAP and Mil-DAP

A smaller 32x32 version was created between 1984 and 1987. The commercial version was called the Mini-DAP, normally attached to a PERQ system (so was sometimes called the PERQ-DAP), and the ruggedised military version was called the Mil-DAP.

See also
 Goodyear MPP
 Thinking Machines Connection Machine
 MasPar
 Parsytec
 SUPRENUM

References

External links
 
 DAP personal history
 PERQ-DAP

DAP
Massively parallel computers
 
DAP